Stanley Drucker (February 4, 1929 – December 19, 2022) was an American clarinetist. For nearly five decades, he was principal clarinetist of the New York Philharmonic. According to Guinness World Records, he achieved the longest career as a clarinetist. Drucker premiered the clarinet concerto by John Corigliano.

Life 
Born in Brooklyn, New York, on February 4, 1929, of Russian-Jewish ancestry, Drucker began clarinet studies at age ten with Leon Russianoff, and remained his student for five years.  He attended the High School of Music & Art (now the Fiorello H. LaGuardia High School of Music & Art and Performing Arts, at Lincoln Square).  Although Drucker entered the Curtis Institute of Music at the age of 15, he left after one year when he was recruited by the Indianapolis Symphony Orchestra.  After a year, he worked with the Busch Little Symphony, organized by Adolf Busch.  He then became principal clarinetist of the Buffalo Philharmonic Orchestra.

In 1948, Drucker won a post in the New York Philharmonic clarinet section.  In 1960, he became the orchestra's principal clarinetist, where he remained for the duration of his career.  His time with the New York Philharmonic included nearly 150 solo appearances with the orchestra.  He gave the first performances of clarinet concerto by John Corigliano and William Bolcom, both of these commissions for the New York Philharmonic.  Drucker appeared on two recordings of the Corigliano Clarinet Concerto, a studio recording conducted by Zubin Mehta and a live recording of the 1977 premiere performance conducted by Leonard Bernstein.

In January 2008, the New York Philharmonic announced Drucker's retirement from the orchestra at the close of the 2008–2009 season, for a total of 61 years with the orchestra and 49 years as its principal clarinet.  His final solo appearance with the orchestra was held in June 2009, in performances of the clarinet concerto of Aaron Copland.

Legacy
Drucker was highly regarded for his musicianship and his longevity of service with the New York Philharmonic, totaling 10,200 concerts, such as expressed by Gustavo Dudamel in November 2007: "He's a legend. The history of the orchestra is in him." In 2009, Lorin Maazel said: "He stands alone in the world of clarinetists. His contribution to the orchestra and its fame is immeasurable."

Awards 
Drucker was nominated for two Grammy Awards (1981, 1991).

On June 4, 2009, Drucker was awarded a Guinness World Record for longest career as a clarinetist after his performance of Aaron Copland's Clarinet Concerto with the orchestra.  Guinness thus logged his Philharmonic career at "62 years, 7 months and 1 day as of June 4, 2009".

He was named honorary member of the New York Philharmonic, as the first orchestra musician honored.

In 2010, Drucker received an honorary doctorate in music from the University of Florida.

Drucker appears in The New Grove Dictionary of Music and Musicians.

Personal life 
Drucker was married to Naomi Drucker, a former principal clarinetist of the North Carolina Symphony, music professor at Hofstra University, and co-founder and co-director of the American Chamber Ensemble.  They have two children, Leon, who is the double bassist for The Stray Cats under the stage name of "Lee Rocker", and Rosanne, an alternative-country singer–songwriter.

Drucker died in Vista, California, on December 19, 2022, at age 93.

Recordings

Citations

General and cited references

External links 
 50th Anniversary link
 Stanley Drucker's page at World Clarinet Alliance website
 N.Y. Philharmonic Bids Farewell To Clarinetist on NPR
 Honorary Doctorate at UF, Buffet Crampon
 
 

1929 births
2022 deaths
20th-century clarinetists
21st-century clarinetists
American classical clarinetists
American people of Russian descent
Classical musicians from New York (state)
Curtis Institute of Music people
The High School of Music & Art alumni
Jewish American classical musicians
Musicians from Brooklyn
21st-century American male musicians
20th-century American male musicians
20th-century American Jews
21st-century American Jews